Petr Veselý (born 25 November 1976) is a Czech male canoeist who won 13 medals at senior level at the Wildwater Canoeing World Championships.

Medals at the World Championships
Senior

References

External links
 

1976 births
Living people
Czech male canoeists
Place of birth missing (living people)